Isovoacangine is a naturally occurring substance that has action on heart muscles in pigs.

Chemistry

Derivatives
3-Hydroxyisovoacangine and 3-(2'-oxopropyl)isovoacangine are derivates of isovoacangine.

Natural occurrence 
It occurs naturally in many Tabernaemontana (milkwood) species such as Tabernaemontana pachysiphon and Tabernaemontana divaricata.

See also 
 Voacangine
 Tabernanthine
 Ibogaline
 Vinervine

References 

Indole alkaloids